The 2010 Copa Sudamericana Finals was the final two-legged tie that determined the 2010 Copa Sudamericana champion. It was played on 1 and 8 December 2010 between Brazilian club Goiás and Argentine club Independiente. The first leg, held in Estádio Serra Dourada in Goiánia, was won by Goiás 2–0 while the second leg, held in  Estadio Libertadores de América in Avellaneda, Independiente was the winner 3–1 the same score.

As both teams were equaled on points and goal difference after a 30' additional time, a penalty shoot-out was carried out to decide a winner. Independiente won 4–3 on penalties, therefore the club won their first Copa Sudamericana trophy.

Qualified teams

Rules

The final was played over two legs; home and away. The higher seeded team played the second leg at home. The team that accumulated the most points —three for a win, one for a draw, zero for a loss— after the two legs was crowned the champion. 

The away goals rule was not used on this occasion. After the two teams were tied on points after the second leg, the team with the best goal difference had won. If the two teams had equaled on goal difference, an extra time would have used. The extra time consisted of two 15-minute halves. In case the tie had not been broken, a penalty shoot-out would have ensued according to the Laws of the Game.

Match details

First leg

Second leg

References

Finals
Copa Sudamericana Finals
Copa Sudamericana Final 2010
Copa Sudamericana Final 2010
Copa Sudamericana Finals 2010
Football in Avellaneda